The Mexican harvest mouse (Reithrodontomys mexicanus) is a species of rodent in the family Cricetidae. It is found in Colombia, Costa Rica, Ecuador, El Salvador, Guatemala, Honduras, Mexico, Nicaragua, and Panama in a variety of habitats at altitudes from sea level to 3800 m.

References

Reithrodontomys
Mammals of Colombia
Rodents of Central America
Mammals described in 1860
Taxonomy articles created by Polbot